T. Tapunuu (born 7 March 1976), is a former Samoan international footballer who played as a forward.

Career statistics

International

International goals
Scores and results list Western Samoa's goal tally first.

References

External links
 T. Tapunuu at FIFA.com

1976 births
Living people
Samoan footballers
Samoa international footballers
Association football forwards